Jeffrey C. Boutelle (Jeff Boutelle), is an American entrepreneur and business executive. Boutelle became Chief Executive Officer and Director of Pharmavite LLC on August 7, 2017. Boutelle has been the President of Beech-Nut Nutrition Corporation since June 2012.

References 

Living people
Year of birth missing (living people)
Bowling Green State University alumni